Verkhny Mamon is a rural locality (a selo) and the administrative center of Verkhnemamonsky District of Voronezh Oblast, Russia. Population:

References

Notes

Sources

Rural localities in Verkhnemamonsky District
Pavlovsky Uyezd, Voronezh Governorate